"Spectacular" is the opening track to the album Happiness in Magazines by British singer-songwriter Graham Coxon. It was released as the third single from that album in 2004 (see 2004 in British music) and peaked at number 32 on the UK Singles Chart.

Track listings
 CD Promo CDRDJ 6643
 "Spectacular"
7" R6643
"Spectacular"
"Billy Hunt" by Paul Weller, originally performed by The Jam (backing vocals by Stephen Street)
CD CDR6643
"Spectacular"
"Life It Sucks" (drums by Danny Goffey of Supergrass)
Maxi-CD CDRS6643
"Spectacular"
"Life It Sucks" (drums by Danny Goffey of Supergrass)
"I Wish" (live)
"Spectacular" (video)

2004 singles
Graham Coxon songs
Song recordings produced by Stephen Street
Parlophone singles
2004 songs
Songs written by Graham Coxon